Evan King and Denis Kudla were the defending champions but only King chose to defend his title, partnering Christopher Eubanks. King successfully defended his title.

Eubanks and King won the title after defeating Marcelo Arévalo and Miguel Ángel Reyes-Varela 7–6(7–4), 6–3 in the final.

Seeds

Draw

References
 Main Draw

Monterrey Challenger - Doubles